Julie Dillon (born in 1982) is an American  artist specializing in science fiction and fantasy art. A freelance illustrator, Dillon has created images for games, book and magazine covers, and covers for musical albums. Dillon's work has been nominated for the Chesley Award three times; she won the 2010 Chesley Award for Best Unpublished Color for "Planetary Alignment" (subsequently published as a cover for Clarkesworld Magazine), as well as the 2011 Chesley Award for "The Dala Horse" in Best Interior Illustration. She was nominated for the World Fantasy Award for Best Artist in 2012 and received the Hugo Award for Best Professional Artist in 2014, 2015, and 2017. She also received two Chesley Awards in 2015 for the Best Cover Illustrations for a magazine and a hardback book. Dillon lives and works in California.

Biography
Dillon received a BFA in Fine Arts from Sacramento State University in 2005, with continued education at the Academy of Arts University in San Francisco and Watts Atelier.

In a 2009 interview, Dillon highlighted Alphonse Mucha, Jon Foster, John William Waterhouse and Andrew Jones as artists who have influenced her work.

Dillon recently completed art for the Llewellyn Worldwide Astrology 2014 calendar.

In 2014 Dillon successfully ran a kickstarter campaign to fund self-publication of a fantasy art collection titled Imagined Realms: Book 1.  In 2015 Dillon successfully ran a kickstarter campaign to fund self-publication of a second collection with a science fiction theme, titled Imagined Realms: Book 2.

Awards and nominations

 Winner of Best Color Work, Best Artist, and Best in Show at ArmadilloCon Art Show
 Included in Spectrum 17, Spectrum 18, and Spectrum 19
 "Artificial Dreams" featured as the cover art for Corel Painter 12’s 20th Anniversary

Bibliography

Notable covers
 "Snow, Glass, Apples" by Neil Gaiman (Black Phoenix Alchemy Lab chapter book)
 Crossed Genres, Issue 12 (Nov 2009)
 "Honeycomb", Clarkesworld Magazine (September 2010)
 "The Never Never Wizard of Apalachicola", by Jason Sanford - used in Issue 20 of InterGalactic Medicine Show (Dec 2010), as well as on the cover of InterGalactic Awards Anthology, Volume I, both edited by Edmund R. Schubert and Orson Scott Card
 "Nautili", Clarkesworld Magazine (February 2011)
 "Gold Sea", Lightspeed Magazine (May 2011)
 "Under the Surface", by Nina Kiriki Hoffman - Issue 25, InterGalactic Medicine Show (Nov 2011)
 "Planetary Alignment", Clarkesworld Magazine (November 2011)
 "Breaking Through", Clarkesworld Magazine (October 2012)
 Luck of the Draw, by Piers Anthony (December 2012)
 The Dark is Rising, by Susan Cooper (June 2013)
 Long Hidden: Speculative Fiction from the Margins of History, edited by Rose Fox and Daniel José Older (January 2014)

References

External links

 Lightspeed Magazine Artist Spotlight: Julie Dillon, by Erin Stocks
 The Process of Creating "Nautili", by Julie Dillon
 The Incredible Digital Artwork of Julie Dillon, by Melody Nieves, Mar 3rd 2012

1982 births
Living people
American illustrators
American speculative fiction artists
American women illustrators
Analog Science Fiction and Fact people
Artists from California
Fantasy artists
Science fiction artists
21st-century American women